Eastborough is a city in Sedgwick County, Kansas, United States, and an enclave of the city of Wichita.  As of the 2020 census, the population of the city was 756.

History
Eastborough was originally envisioned by Burdon Hunter, a British architect. The first development in the Eastborough area began in 1929, but the discovery of oil in the area postponed its establishment until the middle of the 1930s. Sale of Eastborough Village started April 10, 1929. It was planned to incorporate when the first thirty homes were completed, but Eastborough found itself in disputes with the neighboring Woodlawn subdivision, i. e. they could not agree upon a name for the street between them. The disputes were resolved after the two agreed to apply together for incorporation, and Eastborough and Woodlawn were incorporated as the city of Eastborough on June 1, 1937.

Eastborough became known as a "speed trap", because it has a lower speed limit than Wichita, which surrounds it. The speed limit of Douglas Avenue on both sides in Wichita is 30 miles per hour, where as 20 miles per hour in Eastborough, a reduction of 33%. Eastborough has many residents who regularly walk in the streets of the city. There are no sidewalks in Eastborough which is why the city has a lower speed limit. This issue became well known after Towne East Square shopping center was built east of Eastborough in 1975, because Wichita residents would commonly travel through Eastborough to get to Towne East since nearby Kellogg had traffic congestion problems. After Wichita completed an overhaul of nearby east Kellogg in 2009, Douglas Avenue was no longer the best route to Towne East.

The city gave up some land to the expansion of Kellogg/U.S. Route 54 on its southern boundary in 2002 and a wall was constructed along the southern boundary.  As part of this construction, a new pond and playground was constructed and opened in 2003.

Geography
Eastborough is located at  (37.6864752, -97.2588378).

Its southern boundary is Kellogg/U.S. Route 54, and northern boundary is 2nd Street.

Demographics

Eastborough is part of the Wichita, KS Metropolitan Statistical Area.

2010 census
As of the census of 2010, there were 773 people, 306 households, and 223 families residing in the city. The racial makeup of the city was 96.8% White, 0.9% African American, 0.4% Native American, 0.9% Asian, 0.3% from other races, and 0.8% from two or more races. Hispanic or Latino of any race were 0.8% of the population.

There were 306 households, of which 32.0% had children under the age of 18 living with them, 68.6% were married couples living together, 2.0% had a female householder with no husband present, 2.3% had a male householder with no wife present, and 27.1% were non-families. 23.2% of all households were made up of individuals, and 7.5% had someone living alone who was 65 years of age or older. The average household size was 2.53 and the average family size was 3.01.

The median age in the city was 46.3 years. 26.1% of residents were under the age of 18; 4.1% were between the ages of 18 and 24; 17.7% were from 25 to 44; 37.9% were from 45 to 64; and 14.2% were 65 years of age or older. The gender makeup of the city was 49.2% male and 50.8% female.

2000 census
As of the census of 2000, there were 826 people, 308 households, and 254 families residing in the city. The racial makeup of the city was 97.22% White, 0.48% African American, 0.12% Native American, 0.73% Asian, and 1.45% from two or more races. Hispanic or Latino of any race were 1.09% of the population.

There were 308 households, out of which 36.4% had children under the age of 18 living with them, 75.0% were married couples living together, 5.5% had a female householder with no husband present, and 17.5% were non-families. 14.3% of all households were made up of individuals, and 6.2% had someone living alone who was 65 years of age or older. The average household size was 2.68 and the average family size was 2.99.

In the city, the population was spread out, with 27.4% under the age of 18, 3.5% from 18 to 24, 20.2% from 25 to 44, 35.5% from 45 to 64, and 13.4% who were 65 years of age or older. The median age was 44 years. For every 100 females, there were 104.5 males. For every 100 females age 18 and over, there were 100.0 males.

The median income for a household in the city was $138,564, and the median income for a family was $150,635. Males had a median income of $82,730 versus $48,750 for females. The per capita income for the city was $71,101. About 4.4% of families and 5.8% of the population were below the poverty line, including 11.4% of those under age 18 and 2.0% of those age 65 or over.

Government
The Eastborough government consists of a mayor and five council members.  The council meets the fourth Tuesday of each month at 5:30 pm.

Education
The city is served by Wichita USD 259 public school district.

Infrastructure
Eastborough contracts with the city of Wichita for water purification, sewage treatment, and fire protection service.

Notable people
 Olive Ann Beech (1903-1993), aviation entrepreneur

References

Further reading

External links

 City of Eastborough
 Eastborough - Directory of Public Officials
 Photos: Eastborough, wichitaphotos.org
 Eastborough city map, KDOT

Cities in Kansas
Cities in Sedgwick County, Kansas
Wichita, KS Metropolitan Statistical Area
Populated places established in 1937
1937 establishments in Kansas